Thermonema rossianum is a thermophilic and halophilic bacterium from the genus of Thermonema which has been isolated from a saline hot springs in from the Bay of Naples in Italy.

References

Further reading

External links
Type strain of Thermonema rossianum at BacDive -  the Bacterial Diversity Metadatabase

Sphingobacteriia
Bacteria described in 1997
Thermophiles
Halophiles